Agnes Nyanhongo (born 1960) is a Zimbabwean stone sculptor.

Early life and training
A native of Nyanga, Nyanhongo is the daughter of first-generation sculptor Claud Nyanhongo and sister of Gedion Nyanhongo. She spent much time helping in her father's studio as a girl and began sculpting full-time in 1980. In 1983, she entered the B.A.T. Workshop school at the National Gallery of Zimbabwe in Harare, where she spent three years.

Career
Stylistically, Nyanhongo's work is very similar to that of her father, and takes as its theme mainly female issues.  Her sculptures are in the permanent collection of the Chapungu Sculpture Park in Harare, at the Museum of Outdoor Arts in Englewood, Colorado, and at the exhibition Zimbabwe Sculpture: a Tradition in Stone at Hartsfield-Jackson Atlanta International Airport.

The catalogue "Chapungu: Culture and Legend – A Culture in Stone" for the exhibition at Kew Gardens in 2000 depicts Nyanhongo's major works Divided Family (Springstone, 1992) on p. 32-33,  Keeping the History (Springstone, 1999) on p. 108-109, Grandmother Fetches Water (Springstone, 1998) on p. 80-81 and her celebration of the Zimbabwean national heroine Mbuya Nehanda, Mbuya Nehanda - Spirit Medium (Opal stone, 1995) on p. 78-79.
Nyanhongo was resident artist at Chapungu Sculpture Park, Harare (1996–2003) and her work is widely collected: Oprah Winfrey and Maya Angelou are among its known owners.

Selected exhibitions
1985  Africa Central - London
1985  Zimbabwe Heritage Annual, Harare
1990 Contemporary Stone Carving from Zimbabwe, Yorkshire Sculpture Park, UK
1991 Mabwe Gallery,  Harare
1992 Universal Exposition, Seville
1994 Palmengarten, Frankfurt
1995 Galleri Knud Grothe, Denmark
1996 Galerie Im Schlobgarten, Germany
1996 Chapungu Sculpture Park, Harare
1997 Fort Canning Park, Singapore
1998 Old State House, Hartford, CT
2000 Chapungu: Custom and Legend – A Culture in Stone, Kew Gardens, UK
2001 Missouri Botanical Gardens, MO
2003 Chicago Botanical Gardens, IL
2003 In Praise of Women (tour) Oxford, London, Copenhagen, Uppsala
2005 In Praise of Women III (tour) London, Toronto
2014 National Gallery of Zimbabwe, Harare

References

Kusoma zaidi 
 Mawdsley, Joceline (1995) "Agnes Nyanhongo na Colleen Madamombe: Maonyesho ya Sanamu ya Kusanya Ushirika wa Miaka Kumi na Mbili na Hifadhi ya Sanamu ya Chapungu" Chapungu Sculpture Park, Harare
 Winter-Irving, C. (2004)  Vipande vya Wakati: Anthology ya nakala juu ya sanamu ya mawe ya Zimbabwe  iliyochapishwa katika The Herald na Zimbabwe Mirror 1999-2000. Mambo Press, Zimbabwe,

See also
 Sculpture of Zimbabwe

1960 births
Living people
Zimbabwean women sculptors
People from Manicaland Province
21st-century Zimbabwean sculptors
20th-century Zimbabwean sculptors